"Abu Dhabi" is a song by Czech singer Mikolas Josef. It was released as a Digital download on 1 February 2019 through Sony Music Entertainment. The song was written by Christophe Vitorino De Almeida, Jenson Vaughan, Mikolas Josef, Sarah Raba and Walid Benmerieme.

Music video
A music video to accompany the release of "Abu Dhabi" was first released onto YouTube on 31 January 2019 at a total length of two minutes and thirty-seven seconds.

Track listing

Personnel
Credits adapted from Tidal.
 Adam Trigger – Producer
 Chris Meid – Producer
 Mikolas Josef – Producer, composer, lyricist, associated performer
 Christophe Vitorino De Almeida – Composer, lyricist
 Jenson Vaughan – Composer, lyricist, vocal producer
 Sarah Raba – Composer, lyricist
 Walid Benmerieme – Composer, lyricist
 Nikodem Milewski – Co-Producer, mastering engineer, mixing engineer

Charts

Release history

References

2019 singles
2019 songs
Mikolas Josef songs